Ilvetjørnhøi is a mountain in Lom Municipality in Innlandet county, Norway. The mountain is surrounded by several other notable mountains including Veslekjølen to the west; Skarvhøi to the north; Gråvåhø to the east; Grjothovden, Liaberget, and Saukampen to the southeast; and Kvitingskjølen to the south.

See also
List of mountains of Norway

References

Lom, Norway
Mountains of Innlandet